William C. South (1866–1938) of Downingtown, Pennsylvania, United States, patented a tri-color system of color photography in 1904 using a unique camera and printing process. The Solgram was widely exhibited and won many awards in its day, although never became a financial success in the competitive photographic market.

Early life
South was the son of Mary Ella and George W. South of “Arden,” Berwyn, Pennsylvania. According to his biographical sketch found in an advertising piece, he was educated at the Spring Garden Institute in Philadelphia with a degree in Art and Mechanical Engineering. He wanted to be a landscape painter, and frequently used photographs as an aid for his painting studies.

Photography career
In 1891 he was placed in charge of George W. Brown’s photograph Gallery and later purchased it. He also did commercial photography for the Erie Railroad and International Navigation Co. steamship lines. A letter of recommendation reveals that he traveled extensively along the Erie Railroad taking views.

The Solgram
While he succeeded at commercial work his heart was leading him to new forms of artistic expression. South patented a color photographic process in 1904, similar to gum bichromate, which he called “The Solgram.” South’s work was largely based on subtractive color pioneered by Louis Arthur Ducos du Hauron. 
With his partner, Hugh O’Donnell, he patented a unique camera, which took three color separation negatives simultaneously, each with a different colored filter (purple, orange and green). These negatives were used to make full color photographs by treating prepared paper with three different pigments. Each color, red, blue and yellow were printed one layer at a time, registering the image with the negative taken with the corresponding filter.

South took patents on the camera and Solgram process in the United States, Canada, Great Britain, France and Belgium. He founded the Solgram Color-Photo Company on December 21, 1904 and began manufacturing printing kits in his factory building on St. Joseph’s Alley in Downingtown, Pennsylvania. He promoted the process through demonstrations and exhibitions. The first demonstration of the Solgram was given on December 28, 1903 at a meeting of the Columbia Photographic Society in Philadelphia. He won a bronze medal for his color photographs at the Pennsylvania exhibit at the 1904 World's Fair in St. Louis.

He wrote in his pamphlet “The Solgram” A System of Color Photography: “As there is no process of means of producing pictures, which for truthfulness of reproducing nature can rival a water-color drawing executed by master, I have made the aquarelle my standard.”

South received some interest in the process from the United States Department of Agriculture as well as contemporary artists like Charles E. Dana. However, the process had some drawbacks. It was time consuming to produce and registering the negatives exactly for the three printings was difficult. The Solgram Color Photo Co. was declared defunct by 1910.

In 1911 South filed a complaint against Eastman Kodak Company charging that they were attempting to create a monopoly by limiting their dealers to Kodak products only. South sued Kodak for $100,000 for losses incurred by the Solgram Paper Company and for $200,000 for loss of profits from his patents. Kodak denied the charges. South’s evidence was not convincing enough and judgment was not in his favor.

Undaunted, South opened the Keystone School of Photography in his building on St. Joseph’s Alley in Downingtown in 1910. He offered a nine-month course for $150 which taught students how to operate their own photographic gallery. He also offered an advanced degree in “Artography” a term he coined for photography as a fine art. Naturally the Solgram color process was taught. He did not attract the 200 students he anticipated and closed the Keystone School of Photography down around 1912.

Retirement, death, and legacy
South then retired from photography to teach music and make violins. He was an accomplished musician and directed the Premier Concert and Dance Orchestra in Downingtown.

After his wife, Anna Boyle South died in 1935, he moved to the Turk’s Head Inn in West Chester, Pennsylvania. South was well known in West Chester for his collection of rare violins, including a Stradivarius and a Guarneri. He died in 1938 at age 72 in a Berwyn nursing home and left no heirs.  He is interred at Laurel Hill Cemetery in Philadelphia.

An archive of his patents, business papers and photographs are in the collection of the Chester County Historical Society, West Chester. Some of his photographs were exhibited in 1989 at the Philadelphia Museum of Art as part of the Photography Sesquicentennial Project in an exhibition titled “Legacy in Light: Photographic Treasures from Philadelphia Area Public collections” and were featured in the exhibit catalogue.

References

Bibliography
Powell, Pamela C. "Reflected Light: A Century of Photography in Chester County" 1988.

Finkel, Kenneth. "Legacy in Light: Photographic Treasures from Philadelphia Area Public Collections" Philadelphia: Photography Sesquicentennial Project, 1990.

Coe, Brian. "Colour Photography: The First Hundred Years, 1840-1940" London: Ash & Grant, 1978.

External links
 Chester County Historical Society

Pioneers of photography
1872 births
1938 deaths
People from Downingtown, Pennsylvania